Philippe Khorsand (February 17, 1948 – January 29, 2008) was a French actor. His father was Iranian and his mother was French. He first appeared in a number of small roles in the 1970s. One of his most memorable roles as husband and father in Tableau d'honneur (1992).

Khorsand died of a hemorrhage at the age of 59 in Paris.

Partial filmography

 Laisse aller... c'est une valse (1971) - Homme de Varèse
 Hippopotamours (1976) - Un danseur guinguette (uncredited)
 Lâche-moi les valseuses!... (1977) - Philippe
 Le mors aux dents (1979) - Flipper
 Rien ne va plus (1979) - Le conducteur au péage / Jacky / M. Alexandre
 Inspector Blunder (1980) - Le satyre Alphonse Rouchard
 T'empêches tout le monde de dormir (1982) - Michel
 Édith et Marcel (1983) - Jo Longman
 Zig Zag Story (1983) - Police inspector
 Attention une femme peut en cacher une autre! (1983) - Raphaël
 Les Compères (1983) - Milan
 P'tit Con (1984) - Eric
 La vengeance du serpent à plumes (1984) - Ratoff
 La galette du roi (1986) - Clermont
 Si t'as besoin de rien, fais-moi signe (1986) - Grabowsky
 Sauve-toi, Lola (1986) - Rafael Zappa, alias Maurice
 The Joint Brothers (1986) - Un flic
 Les oreilles entre les dents (1986) - Korg
 Keep Your Right Up (1987) - Le passager
 Septième ciel (1987) - Croque-Monsieur
 Les années sandwiches (1988) - Sammy
 Corps z'a corps (1988) - Jean Chabert
 My Best Pals (1989) - Antoine Jobert
 L'aventure extraordinaire d'un papa peu ordinaire (1990) - Sauveur
  (1990) - Charley
 Le zèbre (1992) - Casenave
 Tableau d'honneur (1992) - Paul Martin - le père de Jules
 Une journée chez ma mère (1993) - Lamatte-Verbé, Le banquier
 La Soif de l'or (1993) - Jacques
 La Vengeance d'une blonde (1994) - Régis Montdor
 Les Misérables (1995) - Le policier / Javert
 Men, Women: A User's Manual (1996) - Restaurant chief
 The Best Job in the World (1996) - Le gardien de l'immeuble
 Messieurs les enfants (1997) - L'huissier
 Don Juan (1998) - Monsieur Dimanche
 Si je t'aime, prends garde à toi (1998) - Gamal
 Total western (2000) - Bergosa
 L'affaire Marcorelle (2000) - Georges
 Victoire (2004) - Jean-Paul
 Le courage d'aimer (2005) - (scenes deleted)
 Le temps des porte-plumes (2006) - Le curé
 Musée haut, musée bas (2008) - Frilon - l'administrateur
 La sonate des spectres (2015) - (final film role)

External links
IMDb 
Obituary 

1948 births
2008 deaths
French male film actors
Male actors from Paris
French people of Iranian descent
Burials at Père Lachaise Cemetery